Oscar Alfredo Gálvez (17 August 1913 – 16 December 1989) was a racing driver from Buenos Aires, Argentina. He participated in one Formula One World Championship Grand Prix, on 18 January 1953, in which he scored two championship points.

He was a very popular driver, a regular entrant and multiple-time champion in the Turismo Carretera series, like his brother Juan.

He died from pancreatic cancer at the age of 76. The Buenos Aires circuit was renamed with his and his brother’s name.

Complete Formula One results
(key)

References 
Profile from GrandPrix.com

1913 births
1989 deaths
Argentine racing drivers
Argentine Formula One drivers
Deaths from pancreatic cancer
Maserati Formula One drivers
Turismo Carretera drivers
Burials at La Chacarita Cemetery
Racing drivers from Buenos Aires
World Sportscar Championship drivers

Carrera Panamericana drivers